Samuel Joseph Finley (born 4 August 1992) is an English professional footballer who plays as a midfielder for Bristol Rovers.

Career
Finley was first picked up as a youth by Everton, where he stayed until he was 16.

Finley would then play for non-league clubs Southport and Warrington, before being released by the latter. Following this, Finley was signed by Welsh Premier League side The New Saints.

He would spend 5 years at the Welsh club, making appearances in Champions League qualifying against Legia Warsaw and Anderlecht during his time there. He also won the Welsh Premier League with TNS four years in a row, along with 2 Welsh Cup victories and 1 Welsh League Cup.

In February 2015, he was loaned to Conference side Wrexham.

In August 2015, Finley would move to AFC Fylde on a free transfer. He stayed at the club for 3 years, eventually becoming club captain.

On 29 June 2018, Finley signed a 2-year contract with League One side Accrington Stanley. He made his debut for the club on his 26th birthday, coming off of the bench in a 0–2 home defeat to Gillingham.

In April 2020, Finley picked up an 8 match ban as a result of an investigation around a comment made to Rochdale's former Irish international Paul McShane, during a League One fixture on New Year's Day 2020, regarding McShane's nationality.

On 15 September 2020, Finley left Accrington Stanley by mutual consent and became a free agent. His previous 8 match ban was cited as a reason for the decision.

Fleetwood Town
On 18 September 2020, Finley joined Fleetwood Town on a one-year deal. He made his debut on 20 October, coming on as a substitute in the 84th minute of a 1–0 away defeat against Accrington, the club he had been released from just a month earlier. He scored his first goal for Fleetwood in a 5–1 win against Plymouth Argyle on 21 November 2020. At the end of the season, it was announced that Finley's contract would not be being renewed by the club and he would be one of nine players to be leaving the club.

Bristol Rovers
On 26 May 2021, Finley agreed to join League Two side Bristol Rovers on a two-year contract active from 1 July, linking back up with former-Fleetwood manager Joey Barton. Having missed all of pre-season after contracting COVID-19 as well as picking up a muscle injury, Finley missed Rovers' first two matches of the season and made his debut on 14 August in a 2–0 home defeat to Stevenage. Finley scored his first goal for the club the following week when he curled a consolation goal into the top corner from 25 yards as Rovers lost 4–1 at Exeter City. Finley took the captain's armband for the final match of the season, a 7–0 win over Scunthorpe United that saw Rovers move into the final automatic promotion place on goals scored.

On 20 September 2022, Finley signed a new contract with the club that would see his stay extended until the summer of 2024.

Career statistics

Honours
The New Saints
Welsh Premier League champion: 2011–12, 2012–13, 2013–14, 2014–15
Welsh Cup champion: 2012, 2014
Welsh League Cup champion: 2015

AFC Fylde
National League North champion: 2016–17

Bristol Rovers
EFL League Two third-place promotion: 2021–22

References

1992 births
Living people
Footballers from Liverpool
English footballers
Association football midfielders
Southport F.C. players
Warrington Town F.C. players
The New Saints F.C. players
Wrexham A.F.C. players
AFC Fylde players
Accrington Stanley F.C. players
Fleetwood Town F.C. players
Bristol Rovers F.C. players
Cymru Premier players
Cymru Alliance players
English Football League players
National League (English football) players